The Czechoslovakia women's national handball team was the national handball team of former Czechoslovakia. The team won the World Women's Handball Championship in 1957.

Olympic Games history 
 1980 : 5th place
 1988 : 5th place

World Championship history 
 1957 :  Champions
 1962 :  3rd place
 1965 : 4th place
 1973 : 6th place
 1975 : 6th place
 1978 : 4th place
 1982 : 5th place
 1986 :  2nd place

References

Women's national handball teams
Former national handball teams
Handball
National team